Queensmill may refer to:

Queensmill School, in London
 A neighborhood in Midlothian, Virginia